Houstonia caerulea, commonly known as azure bluet, Quaker ladies, or bluets, is a perennial species in the family Rubiaceae. It is native to eastern Canada (Ontario to Newfoundland) and the eastern United States (Maine to Wisconsin, south to Florida and Louisiana, with scattered populations in Oklahoma). It is found in a variety of habitats such as cliffs, alpine zones, forests, meadows and shores of rivers or lakes.

Description

Houstonia caerulea is a perennial herb that produces showy flowers approximately 1 cm across.  These flowers are four-parted with pale blue petals and a yellow center.  The foliage is a basal rosette with spatula-shaped leaves.  Stems are up to 20 cm tall with one flower per stalk.  Leaves are simple and opposite in arrangement with two leaves per node along the stem.  It thrives in moist acidic soils in shady areas, growing especially well among grasses.

Gallery

References

Further reading

External links
 Bluet gardening information
 Houstonia caerulea photo 
 USDA PLANTS Profile
 Ladybird Johnson Wildflower Center

caerulea
Ephemeral plants
Flora of Eastern Canada
Flora of the Northeastern United States
Flora of the North-Central United States
Flora of the Southeastern United States
Plants described in 1753
Taxa named by Carl Linnaeus
Flora without expected TNC conservation status